François-Régis Mughe (born 16 June 2004) is a Cameroonian professional footballer who plays as a winger for Ligue 1 club Marseille.

Club career
A youth product of Ecole de Football Brasseries du Cameroun since 2012, Mughe transferred to Marseille on 24 June 2022, signing a 5-year contract. He was originally assigned to Marseille's reserves, before training with their senior team in early 2023. He made his professional debut with Marseille as a late substitute in a 2–2 (7–6) penalty shootout loss in the Coupe de France to Annecy on 1 March 2023, scoring his side's second goal in the 90+6th minute.

International career
Mughe was due to be called up to the Cameroon U17s for the 2021 Africa U-17 Cup of Nations, but the tournament was cancelled due to the COVID-19 pandemic.

Playing style
Mughe is a strong and fast right-footed winger who can play on both sides. He is good with both feet, strong in one-on-ones and has good technique.

References

External links
 
 
 Ligue 1 profile

2004 births
Living people
Footballers from Douala
Cameroonian footballers
Association football wingers
France youth international footballers
Championnat National 3 players
Olympique de Marseille players
Cameroonian expatriate footballers
Cameroonian expatriates in France
Expatriate footballers in France